Piljang Union is a Union parishad under Fakirhat Upazila of Bagerhat District in the division of Khulna, Bangladesh. It has an area of 29.78 km² (11.50 sq mi) and a population of 22,367.

Villages 
Town Nawapara
Bailtali
Shambagat
Piljong-1
Piljong-2
Piljong-3
Baliadonga-1
Baliadonga-2
Baliadonga-1

References

Unions of Fakirhat Upazila
Unions of Bagerhat District
Unions of Khulna Division